The Death Curse is a 2003 comedy horror film. It was directed by Soi Cheang Pou-Soi and produced by Amy Tsui. Its popularity was due primarily to its cast, which contained several members of Hong Kong bands.

Cast 
 Steven Cheung plays the part of Ben Ting, the youngest of eight
 Gillian Chung plays the part of Linda Ting, the sixth sibling of eight
 Kenny Kwan plays the part of Jerry Ting, the fifth sibling, who unknowingly used to date his younger half-sister Nancy
 Raymond Wong Ho-Yin plays the part of Nick Ting, the fourth sibling. Nick is a gangster
 Charlene Choi plays the part of Nancy Ting, the seventh sibling
 Alex Fong Chung-Sun plays the part of Lawyer Cheung
 Chen Xianda plays the part of Ding Jihuai, a medical scientist who has spurned his relatives and has numerous failed marriages.

Reception
Sharon Wong of New Straits Times wrote, "You probably wouldn't be scared much, and although certain scenes do contain a chill factor, this quickly dissipates. However, The Death Curse is sufficient entertainment for a dreary afternoon." In the Malay Mail, Lim Chang Moh wrote, "Don't expect great acting and you won't be disappointed. The young stars are nice to look at, even if they appear awkward at times."

Variety film critic Derek Elley stated, "Hong Kong pop duo Twins teams with its newer male equivalent, Boy'z, for some light fun 'n' thrills in The Death Curse, a Mainland-shot haunted house movie by promising helmer Soi Cheang (Horror Hotline … Big-Head Monster). The jury's still out on whether Cheang can marshal his early low-budget invention to more mainstream fare, but Twins fans and fantasy fests will want to check out this almost traditional, CGI-light item."

References

External links
 
 
The Death Curse at Hong Kong Cinemagic
The Death Curse at LoveHKFilm

2000s Cantonese-language films
2003 comedy horror films
Hong Kong comedy horror films
Films directed by Cheang Pou-soi
2000s Hong Kong films